Fathabad (also Romanized as Fatḩābād and Fāteḩābād; also known as Fatḩābād-e Kavār and Fat-h’abad Kawar) is a village in Tasuj Rural District, in the Central District of Kavar County, Fars Province, Iran. At the 2006 census, its population was 3,415, in 679 families.

References 

Populated places in Kavar County